The Roman Catholic Diocese of Asansol is a diocese located in the city of Asansol in the Ecclesiastical province of Calcutta in India.

History
 With his decree, dated October 24, 1997, Pope John Paul II created the Diocese of Asansol bifurcating the Metropolitan Archdiocese of Calcutta (cfr. Acta Apostolicae Sedis|90(1998)|p. 172). The Diocese of Asansol however, came into existence on March 12, 1998, when Bishop Cyprian Monis, its first bishop, officially took possession of it. The act of taking possession is popularly known as "installation".

Leadership
 Bishops of Asansol (Latin Rite)
 Bishop Cyprian Monis (March 12, 1998 – May 4, 2020)

References

External links
 GCatholic.org 
 Catholic Hierarchy 

Roman Catholic dioceses in India
Christian organizations established in 1997
Roman Catholic dioceses and prelatures established in the 20th century
Christianity in West Bengal
Asansol
1997 establishments in West Bengal